Peter Elkas (born July 24, 1976) is a Canadian singer-songwriter, signed to MapleMusic Recordings. Born in Montreal, Quebec, Elkas spent twelve years as part of the Montreal band Local Rabbits, with whom he started playing as a teenager. He released his first solo album, Party of One, in 2004, and has opened for such artists as Ron Sexsmith, Joel Plaskett, Feist and k-os. Charlie Sexton produced Elkas' 2007 release, Wall of Fire. Along with Ian McGettigan, Elkas produced an album of all original material, 2011's Repeat Offender on New Scotland Records.

Discography

Local Rabbits
1993: The Super Duper EP
1994: Put on Your Snowsuit, You Are Going to Hell! (7")
1995: You Can't Touch This
1998: Basic Concept
2001: This Is It Here We Go

Solo albums
2004: Party of One
2007: Wall of Fire
2011: Repeat Offender
2018: Lion (Peter Elkas Band)

With Other Artists
2009: Three Joel Plaskett

References

External links 
 
 Peter Elkas at CBC Radio 3

1976 births
Living people
Anglophone Quebec people
Canadian singer-songwriters
Canadian rock singers
Canadian rock guitarists
Canadian male guitarists
Canadian indie rock musicians
Musicians from Montreal
21st-century Canadian guitarists
21st-century Canadian male singers
Canadian male singer-songwriters